Owen Beck (born February 3, 2004) is a Canadian junior ice hockey forward for the Peterborough Petes of the Ontario Hockey League (OHL) as a prospect to the Montreal Canadiens of the National Hockey League (NHL). Beck was selected in the second round (33rd overall) by the Canadiens in the 2022 NHL Entry Draft.

Playing career
Beck joined Mississauga Steelheads of the Ontario Hockey League for the 2020–21 season but did not play due to the COVID-19 shutdown.

On October 4, 2022, Beck signed a three-year, entry-level contract with the Montreal Canadiens. Returning to junior to continue his development in his third season with the Mississauga Steelheads in the 2022–23 season, Beck recorded 17 goals and 41 points in just 30 games before he was traded to hometown club, the Peterborough Petes, on January 7, 2023.

After seven games with the Petes, with the Canadiens suffering a excess of injuries, Beck was unexpectedly recalled from junior on an emergency basis on January 27, 2023, and made his NHL debut in a game against the Ottawa Senators on January 28 before returning to the Petes.

International play

Beck was a member of Canada's gold medal winning team in the 2023 World Junior Ice Hockey Championships, although he did not receive much playing time during the tournament.

Career statistics

Regular season and playoffs

International

References

External links
 

2004 births
Living people
Canadian ice hockey centres
Ice hockey people from Ontario
Mississauga Steelheads players
Montreal Canadiens draft picks
Montreal Canadiens players
Peterborough Petes (ice hockey) players